Rita Louise Crockett (born November 2, 1957 in San Antonio, Texas) is a former American competitive volleyball player and Olympic silver medalist. Crockett played NCAA Division I volleyball with the Houston Cougars. She is currently the head volleyball and beach volleyball coach and the assistant athletic director for the FIU Panthers at Florida International University.

Crockett is known professionally by her married name, Rita Buck-Crockett. Her height is 5'9".

References

External links
 

American women's volleyball players
Volleyball players at the 1984 Summer Olympics
Olympic silver medalists for the United States in volleyball
1957 births
Houston Cougars women's volleyball players
Sportspeople from San Antonio
Living people
Medalists at the 1984 Summer Olympics
American volleyball coaches
Pan American Games medalists in volleyball
Pan American Games silver medalists for the United States
Medalists at the 1983 Pan American Games
20th-century American women
21st-century American women